Kārlis Kļava (9 March 1907 – 1941) was a Latvian military officer and sports shooter. He placed 23rd in the 25 m rapid fire pistol event at the 1936 Summer Olympics. Next year he won that event at the 1937 World Championships, becoming the first Latvian athlete to win a world title, and was selected as Latvian Sportspersonality of the year.

After graduating from the Liepāja State Technical College in 1928, Kļava served in the Latvian army. In 1931, he graduated from the Latvian War School, and from 1932 to 1940 he was a lieutenant of the Riga Infantry Regiment. In parallel with his military career, in the late 1930s he studied engineering at the Faculty of Mechanics of the University of Latvia. Kļava died in 1941 in a Soviet prisoner-of-war camp.

References

1907 births
1941 deaths
Latvian male sport shooters
Olympic shooters of Latvia
Shooters at the 1936 Summer Olympics
People from Saldus Municipality
Latvian people who died in Soviet detention